Artists of Germany include:

A

Tomma Abts
Heinrich Aldegrever
Elisabeth von Adlerflycht
Albrecht Altdorfer
Kai Althoff
Markus Amm
Gerd Aretz
Jean Arp
Artists Anonymous
Asam brothers
Cosmas Damian Asam
Egid Quirin Asam
Isidor Ascheim
Jim Avignon

B

Johannes Baader
Caroline Bardua
Michael Bauer
Johann Wolfgang Baumgartner
Barthel Beham 
Wilfried Behre
Hans Bellmer
Ella Bergmann-Michel
Joseph Beuys
Anna and Bernhard Blume
Bärbel Bohley
Eberhard Bosslet
Erwin Bowien
Pola Brändle
Jörg Breu the Elder
Jörg Breu the Younger
Heinrich Brocksieper
Philip Bußmann
Hans Burgkmair
Michael Buthe

C
Niclas Castello
Dorothea Chandelle
Johann Joseph Christian
Shane Cooper
Charles Crodel
Paul Eduard Crodel

D

Dietmar Damerau
Wilm Dedeke
Christel Dillbohner
Johann Melchior Dinglinger
Louise Droste-Roggemann
Albrecht Dürer

E

Otto Eckmann
Martin Eder
Erwin Eisch
Knut Ekwall
Max Ernst
Kota Ezawa

F

Ludwig Fahrenkrog
Lyonel Feininger
Feuchtmayer
Johann Michael Feuchtmayer the Elder
Franz Xaver Feuchtmayer the Younger
Franz Joseph Feuchtmayer
Franz Xaver Feuchtmayer
Johann Michael Feuchtmayer
Joseph Anton Feuchtmayer
Michael Feuchtmayer
Caroline Auguste Fischer
Karl von Fischer
Ferdinand Wolfgang Flachenecker
Elsa von Freytag-Loringhoven
Johnny Friedlaender
Caspar David Friedrich
Stephan Fritsch
Daniel and Geo Fuchs
David Füleki

G
Wolfgang Ganter
Heinrich Gätke
Isa Genzken
Sigfried Giedion
Willi Glasauer
Mathias Goeritz
Ekkeland Götze
Henry Gowa
Carl Grossberg
Dieter Grossmann
Matthias Grünewald
Ignaz Günther
Matthäus Günther
Andreas Gursky

H

Hans Haacke
Karl Hagedorn (German-American painter)
Alfred 23 Harth
Kati Heck
Wilhelm Heine
Bettina Heinen-Ayech, painter
Carola Helbing-Erben
Amalia von Helvig 
Ingrid Hermentin 
Augustin Hirschvogel
Hannah Höch
Heinrich Hoerle
Hans Holbein the Elder
Herbert Holzing
Ottmar Hörl
Rebecca Horn
Karl Hubbuch
JoKarl Huber
Johann Erdmann Hummel
Maria Innocentia Hummel
Otto Hupp

J
Jaan Patterson
Janosch
Horst Janssen
Wolfgang Joop

K

Johann Joachim Kändler
Wolf Kahlen
Leo Kahn
Johannes Kahrs (artist)
Hanns-Christian Kaiser
Johanna Keimeyer
Hans Kemmer
George Kenner
Georg Friedrich Kersting 
Ludwig Kieninger
Martin Kippenberger
Paul Klee
Leo von Klenze
Mario Klingemann
Erich Klossowski
August Klotz
Käthe Kollwitz
Thomas Köner
Rudolf Kortokraks
Gerhard von Kügelgen
Susanne Kühn
Diether Kunerth

L

Ulf Langheinrich
Rainer Maria Latzke
Andrea Lehmann
Heinrich Leutemann
Max Liebermann
Elfriede Lohse-Wächtler
Lore Lorentz
Markus Lüpertz
Bernd Luz

M

August Macke
Alfred Mahlau
Eduard Magnus 
Franz Marc
Leo Marchutz
Master of the Housebook
Master L. Cz.
Petra Mattheis
Christoph Meckel
Ada Mee
Johann Peter Melchior
Adolph Menzel
Gerhard Mevissen
Paula Modersohn-Becker
Una H. Moehrke
Manfred Mohr
Georg Mühlberg
Wolfgang Müller
Gabriele Münter

N
Georg Nees
Renee Nele
Gert Neuhaus
Natias Neutert

O
Markus Oehlen
Karl Oenike
Méret Oppenheim

P
Louise Pagenkopf
Otto Pankok
Bruno Paul
Otto Piene
Friedrich Preller
Paul Preuning
Karin Putsch-Grassi

R

Neo Rauch
Sandra Rauch
Margaretha Reichardt
Mirko Reisser (DAIM)
Alfred Rethel
Ottilie Reylaender (1882-1965)
Gerhard Richter
Henry James Richter
Hans Richter
Tilman Riemenschneider
Dieter Roth
Christoph Ruckhäberle
Julika Rudelius

S
August Sander
Hanns Scharff
Silke Schatz
Ingrid Schmeck
Walter Schönenbröcher
Adolf Schreyer
Simon Schubert
Emil Schult
Eberhard Schulze
Thomas Schütte
Simon Schwartz (artist)
Kurt Schwitters
Franz Wilhelm Seiwert
Gert Sellheim
Daryush Shokof
Friederike Sieburg
Zuzanna Skiba
Florian Slotawa
Conrad von Soest 
Virgil Solis
Kathrin Sonntag
Michael Sowa
Franz Joseph Spiegler
Bodo Sperling
Birgit Stauch
Hans Steinbach
Johannes Stenrat
Veit Stoss
Johann Baptist Straub 
Madeleine Strindberg
Gunta Stölzl
Peter Eduard Stroehling
Erika Stürmer-Alex

T
Ruben Talberg
Ulrike Theusner
Elsa Thiemann
Elisabeth Treskow
Susanne Tunn
Rosemarie Trockel

U

Ulay

V
van Ray
Various & Gould
Markus Vater
Peter Vischer the Elder
Wolf Vostell

W
Carl Wagner (painter)
Grete Waldau
Horst Walter
Johann Jakob Walther
Karl Walther
Petrus Wandrey
Karl Josef Weinmair
Victor Weisz
Ralf Winkler
Adolf Wissel, 
Herma Auguste Wittstock
Henry Otto Wix 
Gert Heinrich Wollheim
Paul Wunderlich

Z
Gabriel Zehender
Adolf Ziegler
Gottfried and Thekla Zielke
Johann Baptist Zimmermann
Thomas Zipp

German
 
Artists